John J. Moore (c. 1920 – January 18, 1976) was an American politician from New York.

Life
He entered politics as a Democrat. On February 14, 1974, he was elected to the New York State Senate, to fill the vacancy caused by the election of Nicholas Ferraro as D.A. of Queens County. Moore was re-elected in November 1974, and remained in the Senate until his death in 1976, sitting in the 180th and 181st New York State Legislatures.

He died on January 18, 1976, at his home in Jackson Heights, Queens, of a heart attack.

References

1920 births
1976 deaths
People from Queens, New York
Democratic Party New York (state) state senators
20th-century American politicians